Estadio Wilfrido Massieu is an outdoor stadium located north of Mexico City, within the "Adolfo Lopez Mateos" campus of the National Polytechnic Institute (IPN). It was built in 1959 and has a capacity of 15,000 spectators. The stadium is the home field of the IPN's college football teams: the Águilas Blancas and Burros Blancos .

The stadium was primarily used for American football until 2000, when it was vetoed from American football events by damages in its structure. However, in 2015 it was announced that the stadium will again host American football matches.

Currently, the stadium is also used by the Mayas of the Liga de Fútbol Americano Profesional.

See also 
 Águilas Blancas
 Mexican College Football

References

External links

College American football venues in Mexico
Athletics (track and field) venues in Mexico
Wilfrido Massieu
Instituto Politécnico Nacional
1959 establishments in Mexico
Sports venues completed in 1959